Samuel Harris is an American former Negro league outfielder who played in the 1930s.

Harris played for the Monroe Monarchs in 1932. In 32 recorded games, he posted 16 hits and nine RBI in 92 plate appearances.

References

External links
 and Seamheads

Year of birth missing
Place of birth missing
Monroe Monarchs players
Baseball outfielders